Kohir Deccan is a town and Mandal headquarters in the Sangareddy district of Telangana, India. Kohir is on the Deccan Plateau in Telangana, neighbouring Karnatake state (Bidar). Kohir, Zaheerabad, Bidar, and neighbouring places brings to mind the Red Planet, and the land is usually red roads, red stones on streets with red houses made of red soil and black soil in agriculture land. Kohir was named after the distinctive red soil of the region. Kohir in local slang means "red diamond". The "Pati Matti" once mixed with water turns into very strong material fit for construction of multistoried buildings. These mud houses are unbreakable and can withstand even the harsh climate of this region. Kohir is bounded by Zahirabad, Jharasangam and Munpalle mandals of Sangareddy district and Rangareddy district.

Kohir is very famous for agriculture products such as ginger, all kind of grains, in fruits specially guava also there are many kinds of mangoes production. 
Kohir is very famous for its red soil.
There are many popular faces/persons working in different areas such as politics, technically and in the social services.

Geography
It has an average elevation of 627 metres (2060 ft). It is 100 km from Hyderabad,   53 km from Bidar and 21 km from Zaheerabad.

Demographics
According to the Indian census, 2011, the demographic details of Kohir Mandal are as follows:
 Total Population: 55,239 in 9,596 households.
 Male Population: 28,402	 and Female Population: 26,837		
 Children Under 6 years: 8,719 (Boys: 4,534, and Girls: 4,185)
 Total Literates: 26,451

Kohir village has a population of 14,077 in 2011. The male population was 7,243 and the female population was 6,834.

References

External links
kohir population

Mandals in Medak district
Sangareddy district